The R214 road is a regional road in Ireland which links Castleshane with the Republic of Ireland–United Kingdom border.

See also 

 Roads in Ireland
 National primary road
 National secondary road

References 

Regional roads in the Republic of Ireland
Roads in County Monaghan